Germán Patricio Tagle Lara (born 8 January 1975) is a Chilean football manager and former footballer who played as a defensive midfielder or defender for clubs in Chile and the United States.

Club career
As a youth player, Tagle was with Club Flamenco from LAF (Liga Amigos del Fútbol) in Peñalolén, Santiago. At professional level, having played for both Universidad de Concepción and Magallanes in the Primera B de Chile, Tagle is better known by his stitn with Unión Española from 2000 to 2003 in the top division. In the same division, he after played for Universidad Católica in 2004 and Palestino in 2004–05.

Following his retirement, he has played football at amateur level in clubs such as Unión Santa Emilia from Curacaví and Club Flamenco.

Coaching career

From 2019 to 2021, he also worked alongside Balladares as assistant in the Chile national team at under-15 level and at under-17 level.

Personal life
His father of the same name, Germán Tagle Santander, is a football coach and director and former player who has served for Club Flamenco for over fifty years.

As a player of Universidad de Concepción, he and his fellow footballers César Santis and Arturo Norambuena made up a rock band called Offside.

References

External links
 
 Germán Tagle at SoccerStats.us
 

1975 births
Living people
Footballers from Santiago
Chilean footballers
Chilean expatriate footballers
Primera B de Chile players
Universidad de Concepción footballers
Deportes Magallanes footballers
Magallanes footballers
Chilean Primera División players
Unión Española footballers
Club Deportivo Universidad Católica footballers
Club Deportivo Palestino footballers
USL Second Division players
Western Mass Pioneers players 
Chilean expatriate sportspeople in the United States
Expatriate soccer players in the United States
Association football midfielders
Association football defenders
Chilean football managers
Chilean expatriate football managers
Expatriate soccer managers in the United States